Majorville is an unincorporated community in Benton County, Missouri, United States.

The community most likely was named after the local Major family.

References

Unincorporated communities in Benton County, Missouri
Unincorporated communities in Missouri